

Ludwig "Lutz" Beckmann (26 October 1895 – 20 January 1965) was a German Luftstreitkräfte ace during World War I and a recipient of the Knight's Cross of the Iron Cross during World War II. The Knight's Cross of the Iron Cross was awarded to recognise extreme battlefield bravery or successful military leadership. Ludwig Beckmann claimed eight aerial victories during World War I all on the Western Front.

Beckmann joined Jagdstaffel 6 in December 1917. On 21 February 1918, he transferred to Jagdstaffel 48. He transferred once again, to Jagdstaffel 56, on 11 March 1918. Two days later, he scored his first aerial victory. He would score eight confirmed victories before war's end.

Beckmann commanded a special transport unit, IV/TG1, during World War II. He flew over 200 air bridge sorties into besieged Demjansk, Russia with this unit. He also commanded a Junkers 52 unit, KGr zbV 500.

Awards

 German Cross in Gold on 16 July 1942 as Oberstleutnant in Kampfgruppe z.b.V. 500
 Ehrenpokal der Luftwaffe on 19 October 1942 as Oberstleutnant and Gruppenkommandeur
 Knight's Cross of the Iron Cross on 14 March 1943 as Oberstleutnant and commander of Kampfgruppe z.b.V. 500

References

Citations

Bibliography
 Franks, Norman; Bailey, Frank W.; Guest, Russell. Above the Lines: The Aces and Fighter Units of the German Air Service, Naval Air Service and Flanders Marine Corps, 1914–1918. Grub Street, 1993. , .
 
 
 

1895 births
1965 deaths
Military personnel from Dortmund
Luftwaffe pilots
German World War I flying aces
Luftstreitkräfte personnel
Recipients of the clasp to the Iron Cross, 1st class
Recipients of the Gold German Cross
Recipients of the Knight's Cross of the Iron Cross
People from the Province of Westphalia
German World War II pilots